Inside Love is a 2013 Spanish romantic thriller film directed by Santiago Tabernero from a screenplay by Tabernero and Eduardo Noriega, based on the novel Presentimientos by Clara Sánchez. It stars Marta Etura and Eduardo Noriega alongside Alfonso Bassave.

Plot 
The couple formed by Julia and Félix is undergoing a crisis, so they take a change at a getaway trip to the seaside. Upon a traffic accident suffered by Julia when going to buy diapers that puts her in a coma, the story bisects in two narrative lines pertaining Julia's dream world and Félix's findings about her in the real world.

Cast

Production 
A Tornasol Films, Castafiore Films, and Zapping Entertainment production, the film also had the participation of TVE. It was shot in locations of the province of Alicante, including Alicante, Elche, Villajoyosa, and Santa Pola.

Release 
The film made its world premiere at the Valladolid International Film Festival (Seminci) on 20 October 2013. Distributed by, it was theatrically released in Spain on 24 January 2014.

Reception 
Jonathan Holland of The Hollywood Reporter underscored as a bottom line: "intriguing but underachieved", Inside Love's "stab at profundity ironically leaves it looking superficial".

Mirito Torreiro of Fotogramas rated the "aesthetically very well cared for, well narrated" film 3 out of 5 stars, highlighting Etura's performance as the best thing about it while citing as a negative point that the two levels in which the film moves do not always match well.

Sergio F. Pinilla of Cinemanía rated the film 3½ out of 5 stars, considering that by fusing the psychological thriller with the couple crisis, on top of a resort hotel setting, the proposal is imbued of "a certain degree of exoticism and originality".

See also 
 List of Spanish films of 2014

References 

2010s romantic thriller films
Spanish psychological thriller films
Spanish romantic thriller films
2013 thriller films
2013 romantic drama films
2010s Spanish-language films
2010s Spanish films
Tornasol Films films
Films based on Spanish novels
Films shot in the province of Alicante
Spanish nonlinear narrative films
Films about dreams